Adolf Heinrich Anton Magnus Neuendorff (June 13, 1843 − December 4, 1897), also known as Adolph Neuendorff, was a German American composer, violinist, pianist and conductor, stage director, and theater manager.

Life

Early years
Born in Hamburg, Germany on June 13, 1843, Neuendorff emigrated with his father to New York City, United States in 1855. In New York, he studied music, violin lessons with G. Matzka and Joseph Weinlich, and lessons of piano, music theory and composition with Dr. Gustav Schilling. In 1859, he made his debut as a concert pianist at Dodworth Hall. In 1861, went on a tour around Brazil, playing the violin.

Milwaukee
In 1864, he returned to the United States, now living in Milwaukee, Wisconsin. Here he was conductor of the orchestra at the German Theatre and chorus-master of Carl Anschutz's German Opera Company. Later he succeeded Anschutz as conductor.

New York
In 1867, he became music-director of the New Stadt Theatre in New York. It was here where he conducted the American first performances of Richard Wagner's Lohengrin, on April 3, 1871, and Die Walküre, on April 2, 1877. In 1872, he brought Theodor Wachtel to the United States, and, with Carl Rosa, gave a season of Italian opera at the Academy of music. In that same year, he also established the Germania Theatre in New York, of which he was manager for eleven years. During that time he was also organist of a church and conductor of a choral society. In 1875, he gave a season of German opera with Wachtel and Madame Pappenheim, conducted the Beethoven centennial concerts, and in 1876 he went to the first Wagner festival at Bayreuth as correspondent for the New Yorker Staats-Zeitung.  In the 1878–79 season he conducted the New York Philharmonic Society in the absence of Theodore Thomas, who was away in Cincinnati.  The first American performance of Brahms's 2nd Symphony was given by the Philharmonic orchestra under Neuendorff's direction on October 3, 1878. On December 21, 1878, he conducted the same orchestra during the United States premiere of Tchaikovsky's Francesca da Rimini, Fantasy after Dante.  For the 1879/80 season, Thomas returned from Cincinnati to New York, and was elected conductor of the Philharmonic well ahead of Neuendorff and Leopold Damrosch.  Neuendorff began to compose comic operas and operettas himself, most of which were written to librettos in German as well as in English. Besides, he translated German operas into English to be performed on Broadway, for example Franz von Suppé's Die Afrikareise.

Boston
Between 1884 and 1889, he lived in Boston, Massachusetts and on July 11, 1885, conducted the first "Promenade Concert" performed by the Boston Pops Orchestra at the Boston Music Hall. The first program included a novelty number titled An Evening with Bilse, which humorously tossed together scraps of Beethoven and Strauss, Wagner and Weber. Given that everything else on the program was European as well, the audience at the first "Promenade Concert" could not have imagined that it was launching a peculiarly American tradition.

Vienna
In 1889, he became the Director of soprano Emma Juch's Grand Opera Company. Two years later, he moved to Vienna, Austria with his wife, singer Georgine von Januschofsky, before returning to New York City where he died on December 4, 1897, aged 54.

Works
His compositions include two symphonies, operas, and numerous other instrumental and vocal works.
The Rat-Charmer of Hamelin/Der Rattenfänger von Hameln (opera, 1880)
Don Quixote (opera, 1882)
Prince Waldmeister (opera, 1887)
The Minstrel (opera, 1892)

References

Bibliography

External links

1843 births
1897 deaths
American classical pianists
Male classical pianists
American male pianists
American conductors (music)
American male conductors (music)
American classical violinists
Male classical violinists
American male classical composers
American classical composers
German emigrants to the United States
American expatriates in Austria
American opera composers
Male opera composers
Music directors of the New York Philharmonic
19th-century classical composers
19th-century conductors (music)
19th-century classical pianists
19th-century classical violinists
American male violinists
19th-century American pianists
19th-century American composers